Wellington Lee,  (17 September 1925 – 25 December 2022) was an Australian politician and pharmacist who served as the Deputy Lord Mayor of Melbourne from 1999 to 2000.

Life and career
Lee was born on 17 September 1925, in Darwin in the Northern Territory, and attended Darwin Public School, Longreach State School, Ingham Rural School, Toowoomba Grammar School and finally the Victorian College of Pharmacy. He worked as a pharmacist from 1950. From 1978 to 1980 he was commissioner of the Melbourne and Metropolitan Board of Works, and was a Melbourne City Councillor from 1977 to 1990 and from 1996 to 2001, serving as Deputy Lord Mayor for some of that period.

Lee contested three federal elections: in 1974, contesting Kooyong for the Labor Party; in 1998, as third on the Unity Party's Senate ticket; and in 2001 at the top of the Unity ticket. He was unsuccessful on all of these occasions.

Lee died on 25 December 2022, at the age of 97.

Awards
1982 Order of the British Empire
1993 National Medal
1994 Medal of the Order of Australia
2003 Member of the Order of Australia

References

1925 births
2022 deaths
Australian pharmacists
Members of the Order of Australia
Officers of the Order of the British Empire
Unity Party (Australia) politicians
People from Darwin, Northern Territory